Isaac Arapata Salmon (born 5 September 1996) is a New Zealand rugby union player who plays for the Tasman Mako in the Bunnings NPC and the Toronto Arrows in Major League Rugby. His position of choice is tighthead prop. Salmon was educated at Nelson College from 2011 to 2014.

Career 
He was named in the  squad for the 2018 Super Rugby season but did not play. He was part of the Tasman team that won the Mitre 10 Cup in 2019 for the first time. He was again part of the Mako side that won their second premiership title in a row in 2020.

References 

1996 births
Living people
Blues (Super Rugby) players
New Zealand rugby union players
People educated at Nelson College
Rugby union players from Christchurch
Rugby union props
Tasman rugby union players
Toronto Arrows players